Lee Joo-seung (born July 20, 1989) is a South Korean actor. He is best known for starring in independent films, notably Shuttlecock (2014), and drama series such as Pinocchio (2014), The Producers (2015) and Happiness (2021). He is a cast member of the variety show I Live Alone since 2021.

Early life and education
Lee Joo-seung was born on July 20, 1989 in Seoul, South Korea. He studied and graduated from the Department of Theater at the Seoil University.

Filmography

Film

Television series

Television show

Theater

Awards and nominations

References

External links
 
 
 

1989 births
Living people
21st-century South Korean male actors
South Korean male film actors
South Korean male television actors
South Korean male stage actors
People from Seoul